Aleksei Viktorovich Makeev (born 22 August 1974), better known as "Alextime" and "Lord Nazi Ruso", is a Russian former YouTube-personality, now serving a sentence of 37 years and 6 months in prison for murdering a Mexican citizen.

He became famous for his videos, in which he openly showed his extreme racism, including referring to a three-year-old Mexican child as a monkey. In 2017, he was attacked by a group of angry local citizens during which he stabbed and killed one of the attackers. He was therefore sentenced to 37.5 years in prison for the murder of a Mexican citizen.

Biography 
Makeev was born and lived in the city Elektrostal in Moscow region. As a teenager, he underwent a psychiatric examination. Back in 2003, he was brought to administrative responsibility. Around 2013, he began systematically and unreasonably attack the residents of the city. He recorded his rude and disorderly conduct and posted on the Internet. In one video, he comes from behind and knocks down a walking old woman in a winter park. As a result, he has gained popularity in certain "creative" circles. Police twice opened a criminal case against him, but to no avail. One month he spent in a psychiatric hospital from where he came out without a serious diagnosis in support of which he showed his driver's license. Makeev was sure that the people around him were persecuting him, making intrigues and provocations.
 
But as the outrage of residents and the number of appeals to the police and psychiatrists increased, he went to Mexico in 2015. In Mexico, in relation to others, he continued to behave just like at home.

Attempted Lynching

On 20 May 2017 a group of local Mexican citizens gathered near the house where Makeev rented an apartment. The crowd initially only shouted insults and threw stones at the windows. The police also came to the scene, but later they left. The crowd burst into Makeev's house, one of the first people in was stabbed by Makeev and died while being transported in an ambulance. The mob attacked and severely injured Makeev. During the fight, Makeev escaped his home and fell on a roof while the mob outside threw rocks at him. The police later returned and stopped the mob. Makeev was found to have received a craniocerebral injury.

Conviction for murdering a Mexican citizen 
Aleksei was found guilty of murdering a Mexican who came to confront him. The victim was identified as Carlos "N". The defense alleged that it was in self-defense that he killed Carlos “N” who was 20 years old, however, the Quintana Roo prosecutors managed to scientifically prove with test data and studies of the mechanics of the facts, that the accused had a knife with which he attacked the now deceased and, taking advantage of his superiority, stabbed him with a knife on several occasions. 
Aleksei was sentenced to 37 years and 6 months in prison.

"Lord Nazi Ruso" 
Makeev was nicknamed "Lord Nazi Ruso" by Mexican citizens because he used to display Nazi swastikas.

References

External links 

 
 

Pseudonymous artists
Russian YouTubers
Russian emigrants to Mexico
1974 births
Living people
Russian murderers